Young and Innocent, released in the US as The Girl Was Young, is a 1937 British crime thriller film directed by Alfred Hitchcock and starring Nova Pilbeam and Derrick De Marney. Based on the 1936 novel A Shilling for Candles by Josephine Tey, the film is about a young man on the run from a murder charge who enlists the help of a woman who must put herself at risk for his cause. An elaborately staged crane shot Hitchcock devised, which appears towards the end of the film, identifies the real murderer.

Plot
On a stormy night, at a retreat on the English coast, Christine Clay (Pamela Carme), a successful actress, argues passionately with her jealous ex-husband Guy (George Curzon). Not accepting her Reno divorce as valid, he accuses her of having an affair. Finally, she slaps him and he leaves the room. While they had been arguing, his eyes twitched violently; they continue to do so when, once outside, he turns angrily to look at the closed door behind him.

The next morning, Robert Tisdall (Derrick De Marney) happens to be walking along the seaside when Christine's dead body washes ashore. He recognizes her, and runs for help. Two young women arrive just in time to see him racing away from the corpse. The police quickly decide that Tisdall is the only suspect. Christine was strangled with the belt from a raincoat; his raincoat is missing and he says it was recently stolen. He admits knowing the victim for three years since he sold her a story but the authorities assume the two have been having an affair. When they learn that she has left him money in her will (unbeknownst to him), they feel they have hit upon a motive and Tisdall is arrested.

Scotland Yard detectives grill him all night. The next morning, he faints and is revived with the aid of Erica Burgoyne (Nova Pilbeam), daughter of the local police Chief Constable. Tisdall is assigned an incompetent solicitor, and is taken into court for his formal arraignment. Doubting if his innocence will ever be established, he takes advantage of overcrowding in the courthouse to escape, wearing the solicitor's eyeglasses as a disguise. He gets away by riding on the running board of Erica's Morris car, revealing himself to her after the car runs out of petrol.

He helps push the car to a filling station, pays for petrol, and convinces her to give him a ride. Though she is initially fearful and unsure about her passenger, Erica eventually becomes convinced of his innocence and decides to help him in any way that she can. They are eventually spotted together, forcing both to stay on the run from the police. Tisdall tries to prove his innocence by tracking down the stolen coat: if it still has its belt, the one found next to Christine's body must not be his.

The duo succeed in tracing Tisdall's coat to Old Will (Edward Rigby), a homeless, but sociable, china-mender. But Will was not the thief; he was given the coat by a man with "twitchy eyes", and with its belt already missing.

After becoming separated from the others, Erica is taken in by the police. Upon realizing that his daughter has fully allied herself with a murder suspect, her father chooses to resign his position as Chief Constable rather than arrest her for assisting a felon. Though mutually undeclared, by this point she and Tisdall are in love, Tisdall sneaks into their house to see her, intending to surrender and assert he kidnapped her, to save her honour and her father's reputation. But she mentions that the coat had a box of matches from the Grand Hotel in a pocket. As Tisdall has never been there, he surmises perhaps the murderer has a connection to the hotel.

The following evening, Erica and Will go to the hotel together, hoping to find him. In a memorably long, continuous sequence, the camera pans right from their entrance to the hotel and then moves forward from the very back of the hotel ballroom, finally focusing in extreme closeup on the drummer in a dance band performing in blackface. His eyes are twitching. He is Guy, the murderer.

Recognizing Old Will in the audience, and seeing policemen nearby (who have actually followed Will hoping he'll lead them to Tisdall), Guy performs poorly due to fear. He is berated by the conductor and, during a break, takes medicine to try to control the twitching, but it makes him very sleepy. Eventually, in mid-performance, Guy passes out, drawing the attention of Erica and the police. Immediately after being revived and confronted, he confesses his crime and begins laughing hysterically.

Reunited once again with Tisdall, Erica then tells her father that she thinks it is time they invited him to their home for dinner.

Main cast

 Nova Pilbeam as Erica Burgoyne
 Derrick De Marney as Robert Tisdall
 Percy Marmont as Colonel Burgoyne
 Edward Rigby as Old Will
 Mary Clare as Erica's aunt Margaret
 John Longden as Inspector Kent
 George Curzon as Guy
 Basil Radford as Erica's uncle Basil
 Pamela Carme as Christine Clay
 George Merritt as Detective Sergeant Miller
 J. H. Roberts as the Solicitor, Henry Briggs
 Jerry Verno as Lorry Driver
 H. F. Maltby as Police Sergeant
 John Miller as Police Constable
 Syd Crossley as Policeman
 Torin Thatcher as the owner of Nobby's Lodging House
 Anna Konstam as Bathing Girl 
 Bill Shine as Manager of Tom's Hat Cafe 
 Beatrice Varley as Accused Man's Wife 
 Peter Thompson as Erica Burgoyne's bespectacled brother

Reception
Variety called the film a "Pleasing, artless vehicle" for Nova Pilbeam, who was "charming" in her role and concluded, "If the pic is not Hitchcock's best effort, it is by no means unworthy of him." Frank Nugent of The New York Times called it a "crisply paced, excellently performed film." The Monthly Film Bulletin wrote, "Innumerable small touches show Hitchcock's keen and penetrating observation and his knowledge of human nature. Comedy, romance, and thrills are skilfully blended." Harrison's Reports wrote, "Good melodramatic entertainment. Because of the novelty of the story, the interesting plot developments, and the expert direction by Alfred Hitchcock, one's attention is held from the beginning to the end." John Mosher of The New Yorker wrote that it was "rather exasperating and disappointing to me. It begins with a smart murder, but wanders off through the English rural landscape in a fashion so lacking in that sound common sense we like in our mysteries, or like to feel is there anyhow, that one's interest fades away."

Aggregator Rotten Tomatoes reports 100% approval of Young and Innocent, with an average rating of 7.6/10.

Changes from the novel

Significant changes were made in adapting the book for the film. The novel is a whodunit centred on the Scotland Yard inspector, who is Tey's regular character Alan Grant. The storyline involving Robert Tisdall, Erica Burgoyne, and the missing coat is similar to the film story, but in the novel it is only a subplot and ends part way through the book when Erica finds the coat and it is intact. Grant then focuses on other suspects, none of whom (including the actual murderer in the novel) appear in the film. Christine Clay in the novel is not divorced, but is in an unconventional marriage to an aristocrat.

Hitchcock's cameo
Alfred Hitchcock's cameo is a signature occurrence in most of his films. He can be seen outside the courthouse, holding a camera, at 14 minutes into the film.

Copyright and home video status
Young and Innocent, like all of Hitchcock's British films, is copyrighted worldwide but has been heavily bootlegged for home video. Despite this, licensed releases have appeared on Blu-ray, DVD and video on demand services worldwide from the likes of Network Distributing in the UK, MGM and The Criterion Collection in the US, and others.

References
Citations

Bibliography

External links

Alfred Hitchcock Collectors’ Guide: Young and Innocent at Brenton Film

1937 films
British black-and-white films
1930s English-language films
Films based on British novels
Films based on crime novels
Films directed by Alfred Hitchcock
1930s crime thriller films
Films shot at Pinewood Studios
Films scored by Jack Beaver
British crime thriller films
1930s British films